Phiala flavina is a moth in the family Eupterotidae. It was described by Max Gaede in 1927. It is found in the Democratic Republic of the Congo (North Kivu) and Uganda.

References

Moths described in 1927
Eupterotinae